Tina Marie Woods is an American psychologist and Alaska Native community advocate.

Early life and education 
Woods is the daughter of late Maria Shaishnikoff and late Juan Duenas Leon-Guerrero. Woods is half Aleut, originally from St. Paul, Alaska and half Chamorro from the Island of Guam.

Woods dropped out of high school in the 10th grade, but went on to graduate from Bartlett High School in Anchorage, Alaska in 1993. In 1999 she graduated from University of Alaska Anchorage with her Bachelors in Psychology primarily focusing on Alaska Native people and Alaska Native youth In 2005 she completed Executive Leadership training through Indian Health Services. In 2007 Woods began her training for her Ph.D. and completed it in 2013, in Clinical Community Psychology with Rural Indigenous Emphasis.

Career 
Woods is a licensed clinical psychologist in the state of Alaska. She has served as wellness program director and administrator for the Aleutian Pribilof Islands Association for over fifteen years, serving the Aleut people of the Aleutians and Pribilof Islands. She is involved in the Alaska Juvenile Justice Advisory Committee, appointed by the Governor in 2002.  She served as an alternate member of the Substance Abuse and Mental Health Services Administration tribal advisory committee on behalf of Alaska. With training from Tlingit teachers, Harold and Phil Gatensby of Carcross, Canada she was able to conduct peacemaking or healing circles. She then was invited in 2007 to use these healing circles at Camp Coho, a day camp sponsored by Alaska Native Tribal Health Counsel for Alaska Native children who have lost a loved one to cancer.  Also in 2007 she served as the Alaska Natives into Psychology Coordinator on the University of Alaska Anchorage campus, promoting Native students to study psychology and other behavioral health programs. She serves on the Data Safety Monitoring for HEALTHH Study (Healing and Empowering Alaskan Lives Toward Healthy Hearts Project).  Serving also on the University of Alaska Anchorage Psychology Department Community Advisory Board, the Alaska Public Health Association, Alaska Psychological Association, and the American Psychological Association.  Woods is a committee member of the Criminal Justice Commission workshop on Behavioral Health, and for the Alaska Opioid Policy Task Force. She was co-chair for the writing of 1115 Behavioral Health Waiver Demonstration Project, which allows patients more access to behavioral health treatment.  She has served the Alaskan Tribal Health System for over fifteen years and currently serves as the Alaska Native Tribal Health Consortiums Senior Director of Community Health Services.

Personal life 
Woods is married to Daniel Woods, an Athabascan from Rampart, Alaska. They share a daughter, Jasmine Nicole Woods. Woods resides currently in Anchorage, Alaska where she presides as the Senior Director of Community Health Services for Alaska Native Tribal Health Consortium.

See also 
List of Alaska Native inventors and scientists

References 

Living people
Alaska Native inventors and scientists
People from Anchorage, Alaska
University of Alaska Anchorage alumni
Year of birth missing (living people)
American women psychologists
21st-century American women
Native American women scientists
21st-century Native American women
21st-century Native Americans
American clinical psychologists